The following is a list of United States ambassadors to Tunisia.

History: US Consul in Tunis 
 1795–1796: Joseph Donaldson Jr. (Consul in Algiers)
 1795–1797: Samuel D. Heap (acting consul)
 1796–1797: Joseph Étienne Famin (French, Special Diplomatic Agent)
 1797–1797: William Eaton (Treaty Negotiator)
 1797–1797: Samuel D. Heap (Treaty Negotiator)
 1797–1803: William Eaton (Consul)
 1798–1798: James Leander Cathcart (Treaty Negotiator)
 1798–1798: Richard O'brien (Special Negotiator)
 1803–1803: James Leander Cathcart (Consul)
 1813–1815: Mordecai Manuel Noah
 1815–1819: Thomas D. Anderson
 1819–1824: Townsend Stith
 1824–1825: Charles D. (b) Coxe
 1825–1841: Samuel D. Heap
 1842–1845: John Howard Payne
 1851–1852: John Howard Payne
 1862 – ?: Amos Perry

Ambassadors

Notes

See also
Tunisia – United States relations
Foreign relations of Tunisia
Ambassadors of the United States

References
United States Department of State: Background notes on Tunisia

External links
 United States Department of State: Chiefs of Mission for Tunisia
United States Department of State: Tunisia
United States Embassy in Tunis

Tunisia
 
United States